The election for the governorate council of Iraq's Al Anbar Governorate were held on January 30, 2005, the same date as the Iraqi legislative election.

Election
The largely Sunni province was one of the most violent in Iraq during the Iraqi insurgency, and turnout was extremely low, with the vast bulk of Anbar's residents choosing to boycott the election out of a mixture of distrust for a system perceived to be unfair, and a fear of violence from insurgent groups. Of the total population of some 2.2 million, only 3,775 voted in the governorate council election. Some 13,000 voted in the concurrently held transitional assembly elections.

Helped by the low turnout, the Iraqi Islamic Party was able to win 70.1% of the governorate's council seats on a total of 2,692 votes.

Results

References

2005 elections in Iraq
Al Anbar Governorate
Governorate elections in Iraq